Nicolas Mosar (25 November 1927 – 6 January 2004) was a Luxembourgish politician, jurist, and diplomat.

A Christian Social People's Party (CSV) member, Mosar was elected to the communal council of Luxembourg City in 1959, and sat in the council until 1984, including a period as an échevin.  He first entered the Chamber of Deputies in 1969, and, excluding a two-year spell out (1974–1976) after the CSV's 1974 election defeat, sat in the Chamber until 1984.  During this time, he was also President of the CSV (1972–1974).

Leaving domestic politics, Mosar replaced Gaston Thorn as Luxembourg's European Commissioner in 1985, taking on the brief of European Commissioner for Energy.  After four years in the job, he moved to bilateral diplomacy, becoming Luxembourg's Ambassador to Italy (1989–1992).

He died in 2004.  His son, Laurent, now sits in the Chamber of Deputies and Luxembourg City council for the CSV, just as Nicolas had.

|-

Luxembourgian European Commissioners
Members of the Chamber of Deputies (Luxembourg)
Councillors in Luxembourg City
Christian Social People's Party politicians
Luxembourgian jurists
Luxembourgian diplomats
Ambassadors of Luxembourg to Italy
1927 births
2004 deaths
European Commissioners 1985–1988